In nuclear physics, the astrophysical S-factor  is a rescaling of a nuclear reaction's total cross section  to account for the Coulomb repulsion between the charged reactants. It determines the rates of nuclear fusion reactions that occur in the cores of stars.

Definition 

The quantity is defined as

 ,

where  is the energy,  is the cross section,  is the dimensionless Sommerfeld parameter:

 ,

Motivation 

The Coulomb barrier causes the cross section to have a strong exponential dependence on the center-of-mass energy . The S-factor remedies this by factoring out the Coulomb component of the cross section.

References 

Nuclear physics
Astrophysics
Equations of astronomy